Sangtian  is a town-level administrative unit under the jurisdiction of Nanfeng County, Fuzhou City, Jiangxi Province, People's Republic of China.  As of 2017, it has 11 villages under its administration.

Administrative Divisions 
Sangtian has jurisdiction over the following areas:

Xiaofang Village, Gucheng Village, Zhushanxia Village, Genzhu Village, Hetiangang Village, Sangtian Village, Xinyi Shangcun, Zengjiafeng Village, Yukeng Village, Shuikou Village and Xiyuan Village.

References 

Nanfeng County